Staritsa is the name of several inhabited localities in Russia.

Modern localities
Urban localities
Staritsa (town), Tver Oblast, a town in Staritsky District of Tver Oblast

Rural localities
Staritsa, Astrakhan Oblast, a selo in Staritsky Selsoviet of Chernoyarsky District in Astrakhan Oblast; 
Staritsa, Kaluga Oblast, a village in Ulyanovsky District of Kaluga Oblast
Staritsa, Kirov Oblast, a selo in Yumsky Rural Okrug of Svechinsky District in Kirov Oblast; 
Staritsa, Novgorod Oblast, a village in Velilskoye Settlement of Maryovsky District in Novgorod Oblast
Staritsa, Orenburg Oblast, a selo in Krasnouralsky Selsoviet of Orenburgsky District in Orenburg Oblast
Staritsa, Oryol Oblast, a settlement in Novosinetsky Selsoviet of Bolkhovsky District in Oryol Oblast
Staritsa, Tambov Oblast, a settlement in Maryinsky Selsoviet of Kirsanovsky District in Tambov Oblast
Staritsa, Tomsk Oblast, a selo in Parabelsky District of Tomsk Oblast
Staritsa (rural locality), Tver Oblast, a station in Staritsa Rural Settlement of Staritsky District in Tver Oblast

Alternative names
Staritsa, alternative name of Staritsy, a village in Sabskoye Settlement Municipal Formation of Volosovsky District in Leningrad Oblast;